La Divina Pastora Airport  is an airstrip  north-northeast of Santa Elena de Uairen in the Bolívar state of Venezuela.

See also

Transport in Venezuela
List of airports in Venezuela

References

External links
OpenStreetMap - Divina Pastora
OurAirports - La Divina Pastora
SkyVector - La Divina Pastora Airport
HERE/Nokia - La Divina Pastora

Airports in Venezuela